Edward Herbert may refer to:

Edward Herbert (died 1593), MP for Montgomeryshire
Edward Herbert (died 1595), MP for Old Sarum
Edward Herbert, 1st Baron Herbert of Cherbury (1583–1648), Anglo-Welsh soldier, diplomat, historian, poet and religious philosopher
Edward Herbert (attorney-general) (c. 1591–1658), member of the Parliament of England under Kings James I and Charles I
Edward Herbert, 3rd Baron Herbert of Chirbury (died 1678), English aristocrat and soldier
Edward Herbert (of the Grange), judge and MP for Monmouthshire, 1656
Edward Herbert (judge) (c. 1648–1698), English judge who served as Chief Justice of the King's Bench; MP for Ludlow
Edward Herbert, 2nd Earl of Powis (1785–1848), British peer and Tory politician; MP for Ludlow
Edward Charles Hugh Herbert (1802-1852), British MP for Callington 1831-1832
Edward Herbert, 3rd Earl of Powis (1818–1891), British peer and politician; MP for Shropshire North
Edward Herbert (priest) (1767–1814), Archdeacon of Aghadoe
Edward Herbert (Irish politician) (1727–1770)